2010–11 Kit Premier League is the 2010–11 season of Kit Premier League.

Clubs
Air Force SC
Army SC
Blue Star SC (Kalutara)
Don Bosco SC (Negombo) (Champions)
Java Lane SC (Colombo)
Jupiters SC (Negombo) (Relegated)
Kalutara Park SC (Relegated)
New Young SC (Wennapuwa)
Police SC
Ratnam SC (Kotahena)
Renown SC
Saunders SC (Petta)

Table

References
RSSSF.com
Soccerway.com

Sri Lanka Football Premier League seasons
1
Sri Lanka